AXK may refer to:

 African Express Airways (ICAO: AXK), a Kenyan airline that operates domestic and international passenger services
 Aka language (ISO 639-3: AXK), a Bantu language spoken in the Central African Republic and the Republic of Congo

See also
 AxK